The Electronic Payments Network (EPN) is an electronic clearing house that provides functions similar to those provided by Federal Reserve banks. The Electronic Payments Network is the only private-sector operator in the ACH Network in the United States. The EPN is operated by The Clearing House Payments Company.

See also
 ACH
 FedACH
 Clearing House Interbank Payments System (CHIPS) 
 Fedwire
 National Automated Clearing House
 Universal Payment Identification Code (UPIC)

References

External links
Official website

Banking terms
Interbank networks
Financial services companies based in New York City